Tonara is a comune (municipality) in the Province of Nuoro in the Italian region Sardinia, located about  north of Cagliari and about  southwest of Nuoro.

The municipality of Tonara contains the frazioni (subdivisions, mainly villages and hamlets) Arasulè, Su Pranu, Toneri, Teliseri, and Ilalà (abandoned).

Tonara borders the following municipalities: Austis, Belvì, Desulo, Sorgono, Tiana.

Demographic evolution

References

Cities and towns in Sardinia